Gridiron Queensland is the governing body for gridiron (American football) in the state of Queensland, Australia. There are currently nine teams registered in the men's GQ League and six teams in the women's league. GQ also supports the North Queensland Gridiron League consisting of 4 teams across Townsville, Mackay, Cairns and Rockhampton.

In the end of the season (late November or early December), the Sunbowl takes place where finalists of each division faceoff to win the championship.

After the season, players across the league are selected to form the Queensland Sundevils teams which plays in the National championships. Both the men's and women's Sundevils are current undefeated national champions having won their respective national championships in early 2014.

Female Gridiron League
The Female Gridiron League of Queensland (FGLQ), the first league of its kind in Australia, is a full kit, women's tackle American nine-a-side football competition that commenced on 24 August 2012. The FGLQ was founded by the Logan City Gridiron Football Club and is sanctioned by Gridiron Queensland. Three teams participated in the first season in 2012, the Logan City Jets, Kenmore Panthers and Gold Coast Sea Wolves. The first officially sanctioned game of women's gridiron was played between the Kenmore Panthers and Gold Coast Sea Wolves on 24 August 2012 at Logan Metro Sports, Browns Plains, Queensland. The Logan City Jets defeated the Kenmore Panthers 38-20 in the Summerbowl I championship game played on 2 November 2012. On 23 March 2013 the Female Gridiron League of Queensland Allstars, a team consisting of players who played in the 2012 FGLQ season, toured to Croydon, Melbourne to play the Western Foxes the first women's American Football team in Victoria. The FGLQ Allstars won the game 28-14.   Four teams participated in the 2013 FGLQ season which commenced on 6 September 2013; Logan City Jets, Kenmore Panthers, Gold Coast Stingrays (formally Sea Wolves) and new team the Western Jaguars.  Following on from the pioneering efforts of the FGLQ other states across Australia established women's gridiron leagues including Gridiron NSW in 2013, Gridiron Victoria in 2013 and ACT Gridiron in 2014.

In 2014 Gridiron Queensland took over the administration of women's gridiron in Queensland. The first ever Women's national championship of American football contested between QLD, NSW and ACT was held in early 2014 and players who played season II of the Female Gridiron League of Queensland (FGLQ) were eligible to be selected for the first ever Queensland SunDevils women's team.  The SunDevils were undefeated champions defeating ACT 14-6 in a hard-fought final. Most Valuable Player for the national championship was Queensland player Kristy Moran.

Men's League members
Bayside Ravens
Logan City Bears
Toowoomba Vultures
Gold Coast Stingrays
Brisbane Rhinos
Sunshine Coast Spartans
Moreton Bay Raptors
Townsville Cyclones
Cairns Falcons
Mackay Mavericks
Griffith University Thunder
Rockhampton Wolverines

Women's League members
Logan City Jets
Kenmore Panthers
Gold Coast Stingrays
Western Jaguars
Southern Steelers 
Moreton Bay Raptors
Griffith University Thunder
Bayside Ravens

Previous Sunbowl champions

Previous Summerbowl champions

Female League Records
Most Touchdowns in a Game - four (4) - Hayley Peterson (Logan City Jets) against Gold Coast Sea Wolves, 31 August 2013. Kristy Moran (Logan City Jets) two times against Western Jaguars, 8 November 2013 and 15 November 2013.
 New League Record **
"Most Touch Downs in a Game" - six (6) - Kristy Moran (Logan City Jets) against Logan City Steelers.  On 3 August 2014. Kristy Moran scored six touch downs from seven (7) carriers.

See also

Gridiron Australia

References

External links
Gridiron Queensland official site

Sports governing bodies in Queensland
American football governing bodies in Australia
Sports organizations established in 1985
1985 establishments in Australia